FXR may refer to:

 Farnesoid X receptor
 Foxer, a World War II torpedo countermeasure
 F. X. Reid, pseudonym of British computer science academic Mike W. Shields